The Bergsrå  (Mountain Rå), Bergatrollet (Mountain Troll) or Bergakungen (Mountain King) was a mythical creature of the mountain in Norse mythology.

The bergrå could be either masculine or feminine. It lived in the mountain with a court of relatives and sometimes surrounded by trolls. It was a common phenomena in the mythology about the bergsrå to  trick people into their dwellings in the mountain and to become bergtagen (literary: "taken into the mountain").

A typical description of such a claimed occurrence was given by Sven Andersson in 1691, when he was on trial for having sexual intercourse with a female bergrå.

See also
Rå

References

Other sources
Ake Hultkrantz Editor (1961) The Supernatural Owners Of Nature Nordic Symposion on The Religious Conceptions of Ruling Spirits (Genii loci, genii speciei) and Allied Concepts  (Almquist & Wiksell) 

Scandinavian legendary creatures
Scandinavian folklore
Norwegian folklore
Swedish folklore